Joseph William Tessitore (born January 1, 1971) is an American sportscaster for ABC and ESPN. He leads ESPN's world championship fight broadcasts as the blow-by-blow broadcaster for Top Rank Boxing on ESPN, serves as a play-by-play announcer for Holey Moley on ABC alongside comedian Rob Riggle and NBA star Stephen Curry and announces college football on ESPN and ABC. In 2018 and 2019, Tessitore was also the play-by-play broadcaster of Monday Night Football, alongside former Dallas Cowboys tight end Jason Witten in 2018 and analyst Booger McFarland in 2018 and 2019.

Education
Tessitore graduated from the Boston College Carroll School of Management in 1993. He completed his college preparatory studies at Christian Brothers Academy in Albany, New York.

Early career
Tessitore's broadcasting career began at KXAS-TV, an NBC affiliate in the Dallas–Fort Worth metroplex. In 1994, he briefly moved to WRGB (CBS) in Albany, New York before joining WFSB (CBS) in Hartford, Connecticut in 1995. Tessitore took over the primary sports anchor role in 1997.

ESPN
In February 2002, Tessitore began calling boxing on ESPN as part of Tuesday Night Fights and Friday Night Fights.  Soon to follow, he was appearing on ESPN College Football and college basketball broadcasts. In addition to his regular duties of football, horse racing and fights Joe has covered a wide array of sporting events for ESPN and is also a featured contributor for ESPN.com. Along with Monday Night Football he was also the lead broadcaster for college basketball's Super Tuesday on ESPN, and the SEC Basketball Tournament, where he was paired with Dick Vitale and Sean Farnham. Tessitore is widely regarded as one of the most versatile broadcasters at the network.

Tessitore spent many years anchoring ABC/ESPN Horse Racing presentations including The Belmont Stakes and The Breeders’ Cup World Championships. In 2008, he was leading the ABC broadcast team when undefeated colt Big Brown failed to win horse racing's Triple Crown. In 2015 he was trackside anchoring Sportscenter's weeklong coverage of American Pharoah's history making win. Tessitore also was ESPN's host/anchor when famed race horse Zenyatta's unbeaten streak was stopped. The champion filly was defeated in the Breeders' Cup Classic.

Tessitore has produced documentaries for ESPN's award-winning 30 for 30 series. In 2011 he was the executive producer of the ESPN Film Roll Tide, War Eagle. In 2012 he was the consulting producer on ESPN's 30 for 30 featuring Bo Jackson.

For five years Tessitore was the host of ESPN's live New Year's Eve specials, including RedBull New Year, No Limits, and the debut of ESPN's Year of the Quarterback.

College football
Previous to joining Monday Night Football, Tessitore was the lead play-by-play broadcaster for ESPN's Saturday Night College Football Primetime Game and the College Football Playoff. He appeared in the booth alongside veteran broadcaster Todd Blackledge as part of ESPN's coverage of college football. Tessitore and his primetime crew were honored for their work, including being chosen by Sports Illustrated as the 2016 Broadcast Team of the Year.

Previously, Tessitore also served in the play-by-play role for ESPN's Thursday Night Football and was host of SEC Nation paired with Tim Tebow and Paul Finebaum.  He also has hosted ESPN's College Football Final, College Football Live, various Sportscenter specials and has long been a fixture on ESPN's presentation of the Heisman Trophy, as he is considered the leading expert on the trophy and its voting history. Tessitore is the host of ESPN's extensive coverage of National Signing Day. He has been the broadcaster of multiple Orange Bowls, the Peach Bowl, and the Sugar Bowl broadcast team.  He has worked play-by-play for the BCS Championship on ESPN 3D and is the lead broadcaster for ESPN's Megacast Homers edition of College Football's National Championship Games.

Honors
Tessitore has been honored for his on-air work. Sports Illustrated’s Richard Deitsch has twice named him a finalist for Sports Media Person of the Year.  On January 18, 2010, he accepted an Eclipse Award on behalf of his ESPN production team for their Belmont Stakes broadcast on ABC. On June 4, 2010, the Boxing Writers of America presented Tessitore with the prestigious Sam Taub award for Broadcast Excellence. The Connecticut Boxing Hall of Fame included Tessitore in their 2010 class of inductees.

Outside ESPN
Since 2004, Tessitore has been the voice for the top selling Fight Night video game series produced by EA Sports. He also played himself in three national commercials for Dr. Pepper which aired extensively through fall of 2016 and winter of 2017. Tessitore’s distinct voice-over work has been used in several feature films, including Annapolis, The Break-Up, plus numerous television programs. He has also appeared in the television drama The Dead Zone acting as himself in an episode.

In 2017, he became the co-host of ABC's Battle of the Network Stars, a reboot of the Howard Cosell led celebrity classic from the 1970s and 80s.

Starting in 2019, Tessitore became the head  play-by-play commentator for ABC’s Holey Moley.

In a 2021 episode of Celebrity Wheel of Fortune aired nationally on ABC, Tessitore competed with fellow Holey Moley cast Rob Riggle and Jeannie Mai, winning $57,350 towards his selected charity of Wide Horizons For Children.

Announcing style
In August 2012, he was the subject of an extensive feature story titled, "Tessitore becoming major voice of college football, one upset at a time", written by Stewart Mandel. His call proclaiming "Texas is back, folks!" at the end of a thrilling Longhorns overtime victory over Notre Dame in 2016 became the subject of an Internet meme mocking the Longhorns after the team experienced subsequent struggles.

Not all reviews of Tessitore's announcing, especially on MNF, have been positive.  John Teti wrote that "Tessitore is a merchant of schmaltz... Clichés are a given in football announcing, but few commentators imbue NFL banalities with the portentous sentimentality that Tessitore brings to bear."
The Guardian wrote that "Tessitore sounds like a condescending try-hard." The unpopularity of Tessitore and Booger McFarland with viewers and critics alike led to their removal from Monday Night Football before the 2020 season.

Personal life
Tessitore is a member of the National Italian American Foundation and is on the Board of Directors for the Connecticut Cystic Fibrosis Foundation. Tessitore founded the annual Sportscasters' SuperBall for CF Research.  His son, John, was formerly a kicker at Boston College.

References

External links

 
 Profile on Tessitore, The Ringer
 
 

1971 births
Living people
American horse racing announcers
American television sports announcers
Arena football announcers
Carroll School of Management alumni
Bowling broadcasters
Boxing commentators
College basketball announcers in the United States
College football announcers
Golf writers and broadcasters
Sportspeople from Schenectady, New York
National Football League announcers
American people of Italian descent
People from Wallingford, Connecticut